"Too Many Man" is the debut single by English grime group Boy Better Know, released on May 25, 2009. It broke into the UK singles chart on 6 June 2009, peaking at #79 the following week.

The song was originally conceptualised by Skepta, due to his annoyance over the "lack of women" in nightclubs. The song features BBK members Skepta, Shorty, Jme, Frisco and Wiley. As well as being released as a single, it was also included on Jme's debut studio album Famous? (2008), Skepta's sophomore album Microphone Champion (2009), and Wiley's album Race Against Time (2009). It is the group's most successful and well known song.

Track listing 
CD 
"Too Many Man" – 3:36
"Sticks & Stones" – 3:21

Charts

Certifications

References 

2009 songs
2009 singles
Skepta songs
Songs written by Wiley (musician)
Songs written by Skepta